Amparo Meza Cruz (24 April 1920 – 12 January 2002), known by her stage name Amparo Montes, was a Mexican singer, famous for her renditions of popular boleros by Agustín Lara and Gonzalo Curiel.

References

External links 
 

1920 births
2002 deaths
Singers from Chiapas
20th-century Mexican women singers